Lloyd Frederic Rees  (17 March 18952 December 1988) was an Australian landscape painter who twice won the Wynne Prize for his landscape paintings.

Most of Rees's works are preoccupied with depicting the effects of light and emphasis is placed on the harmony between man and nature. Rees's oeuvre is dominated by sketches and paintings, in which the most frequent subject is the built environment in the landscape.

Early life and education
Rees was born in Brisbane, Queensland, the seventh of eight children of Owen Rees and his wife Angèle Burguez, who was half Mauritian, half Cornish.

Rees attended Ironside State School Ironside State School and Ithaca Creek State School in Brisbane's inner west. After formal art training at Brisbane's Central Technical College, he commenced work as a commercial artist in 1917.

Early career

From the 1940s until the 1960s Rees was part of the Northwood group, a small group of friends who would go on painting excursions around Sydney Harbor and northwestern Sydney. Regulars of the Northwood group were Lloyd Rees, Roland Wakelin, George Feather Lawrence and John Santry. Douglas Dundas, Wilmotte Williams and Marie Santry also associated with the Northwood group. These artists had no manifesto but were conservative, tending towards a neoimpressionist style of landscape painting with sinuous linework. In 1937 Rees became a foundation member of, and exhibited with, Robert Menzies' anti-modernist organisation, the Australian Academy of Art. 

In the 1960s the Northwood Group was active during the modishness of Sydney abstract expressionism, their noted contemporaries were the Merioola Group and stalwart Melbourne postwar voices of disquiet such as Sidney Nolan and the Antipodeans. By the 1970s a young postmodern art scene emerged in Gallery A, Macquarie Galleries, and Watters Gallery. Celebrated painter Brett Whiteley was a member of this younger generation rediscovering the now elderly painter and drawer Lloyd Rees.

Friend and Northwood resident William Pidgeon painted Lloyd Rees portrait which won the 1968 Archibald Prize.

Europe

Rees first travelled to Europe in the 1920s (to meet with his then fiancée Daphne Mayo) and made sketches, including many of Paris, which were left accidentally on a bus in London at that time. While some of his works - and indeed his betrothal to Mayo - were lost, his connection with the landscapes of town and country France and Italy was to last a lifetime. Rees visited Europe again in 1953, 1959, 1966–67 and 1973, painting and sketching on all of his journeys.

The sketchbooks are now held by the Art Gallery of New South Wales, comprising approximately 700 images in pencil, carbon pencil, wash, watercolour and ballpoint pen. They reveal a capacity to characterize the texture and light of landscapes in these brief media - concerns that are equally evident in his paintings throughout his career.

Late works
Rees painted right up to his death at age 93. His works of the last one to two decades in particular showed a preoccupation with the spiritual dimension of the relationship with and portrayal of the landscape, and this became the focus of the final book prepared in cooperation with the author Renée Free: Lloyd Rees: the last twenty years. 

His late works show an abstraction of form and a focus on the source and effects of light on the landscape, such as in his work The Sunlit Tower, painted when he was 91 years old, and winner of the Jack Manton Prize for 1987 (a prize awarded by the Queensland Art Gallery). He claimed that one of the benefits of his failing eyesight in his old age was that he could look directly at the sun.

Rees's own philosophical views he expressed in the Epilogue to their book:From quite an early age I was overwhelmed with the fact of endlessness... Planetary systems can blow up, but the universe is endless, and our little life is set in the midst of this, and everything in it has a beginning and an end... [This] gives to life a sense of mystery that is always with me.

Personal life and death
Rees was engaged to sculptor Daphne Mayo, but it was broken off in 1925. He married Dulcie Metcalf in 1926. In 1927 Dulcie died in childbirth and Rees married again, in 1931, to Marjory Pollard, mother to his son Alan.

Rees' wife died on 14 April 1988 and he died on 2 December of the same year.  Following Rees's death, Alan Rees and his wife Jancis gave to the Art Gallery of NSW all of Rees's surviving sketchbooks.

Honours

Rees won the Wynne Prize in 1950 and 1982. He also won the Commonwealth Jubilee Art Prize in 1957 and in 1971 he won the John McCaughey Memorial Art Prize and the International Cooperation Art Award.

Rees was appointed a Companion of the Order of St Michael and St George (CMG) in 1978 and Australia's highest civilian honour, Companion of the Order of Australia (AC) in 1985.

He was awarded the Médaille de la Ville de Paris in 1987 in honour of his artistic achievements.

For forty years, from 1946 to 1986, Rees taught art with Sydney University's Faculty of Architecture and in 1988 received the Sydney University Union Medal for his contributions to art and the University. In the same year he was named as one of the Australian Bicentennial Authority's Two hundred people who made Australia great.

Collections
Art Gallery of New South Wales
Art Gallery of Western Australia
Darling Harbour Authority
Parliament House, Canberra
National Gallery of Australia
Newcastle Art Gallery
Queensland Art Gallery
Royal Australian College of Physicians
Tasmanian Museum and Art Gallery
University of Sydney
University of Western Australia
West Australian Institute of Technology

Footnotes

References
Edward Duyker, ‘Lloyd Rees: Artist and Teacher’, Arts: The Journal of the Sydney University Arts Association, vol. 30, 2008, pp. 34–53.
Renée Free, Lloyd Rees, Landsdowne, Melbourne, 1972
Renée Free and Lloyd Rees, Lloyd Rees: The Last Twenty Years, Craftsman House, Sydney, 1990
Janet Hawley, 'Lloyd Rees: the final interview', Sydney Morning Herald - Good Weekend Magazine, 15 October 1988
Lou Klepac, Lloyd Rees Drawings, Australian Artist Editions, Sydney, 1978
Hendrik Kolenberg, Lloyd Rees in Europe, Art Gallery of NSW, Sydney, 2002
Lloyd Rees, Peaks and valleys: an autobiography, Collins, Sydney, 1985

External links
 Lloyd Rees at the Art Gallery of New South Wales
 National Gallery of Australia
 Lloyd Rees at Australian Art
 Lloyd Rees: Queensland Art Gallery 1998 exhibition review by Grafico Topico's Sue Smith
 Lloyd Rees "Coming Home" Rockhampton Art Gallery exhibition 1999

1895 births
1988 deaths
Australian people of Mauritian descent
Australian people of Cornish descent
Companions of the Order of Australia
Australian Companions of the Order of St Michael and St George
Wynne Prize winners
20th-century Australian painters
20th-century male artists
Australian landscape painters
Australian male painters
Australian commercial artists